Jagged Little Pill is a jukebox musical with music by Alanis Morissette and Glen Ballard, lyrics by Morissette, and book by Diablo Cody, with additional music by Michael Farrell and Guy Sigsworth. The musical is inspired by the 1995 album of the same name by Morissette and deals with pain, healing, and empowerment. It premiered at the American Repertory Theater in Cambridge, Massachusetts, on May 5, 2018, directed by Diane Paulus.

The show began previews on Broadway in November 2019, and opened on December 5, 2019, and closed on December 17, 2021 due to the COVID-19 pandemic. For the 74th Tony Awards, Jagged Little Pill won two awards on 15 nominations, the most nominations of any show of the 2019–2020 season. It also won the Grammy Award for Best Musical Theater Album.

Background

In November 2013, it was revealed that a musical version of the album Jagged Little Pill by Alanis Morissette was being adapted for the stage with composer Tom Kitt attached to pen new arrangements and orchestrations for the production. A first workshop was expected to take place in 2014; however, in 2015 Morissette revealed that the show was still in early stages and had yet to be written. In May 2017, it was announced that the musical would receive its world premiere in May 2018, 23 years after the album was released. A reading took place in 2017, with Idina Menzel taking the part of Mary Jane. The first public performance of songs from the show took place in March 2018, at the American Repertory Theater Gala.

The show has a book by Diablo Cody, with direction by Diane Paulus, choreography by Sidi Larbi Cherkaoui, set design by Riccardo Hernandez, costume design by Emily Rebholz, lighting design by Justin Townsend, and video design by Finn Ross. Music and lyrics are by Alanis Morissette and Glen Ballard, with musical direction by Bryan Perri, sound design by Jonathan Deans, and orchestrations by Tom Kitt. In addition to music from the show's namesake album, the musical also features other songs from Morissette's catalog, including "Thank U", "That I Would Be Good", and "So Pure" from 1998's Supposed Former Infatuation Junkie, "So Unsexy" and "Hands Clean" from 2002's Under Rug Swept, "Unprodigal Daughter" from 2002's Feast on Scraps, "No" from the Japanese edition of 2012's Havoc and Bright Lights and "Uninvited" from the soundtrack of the 1998 film City of Angels. Morissette also wrote two new songs for the musical, "Smiling" and "Predator", with the former being included as the second single from her ninth studio album Such Pretty Forks in the Road.

Synopsis

Act I

Mary Jane (MJ) Healy is a mother writing the yearly family Christmas letter. She writes about her husband Steve's job promotion, her daughter Frankie's art, and her son Nick's early admission to Harvard University. MJ writes that she got into a car crash, but is healing with the help of natural remedies. What she doesn't write is that Steve is addicted to pornography, Frankie is making out with her best friend, Jo, as the letter is being written, and MJ is addicted to the painkillers from the car accident ("Right Through You"). MJ pressures Nick to be perfect to keep up the family's image ("All I Really Want"). At school, Frankie and Jo discuss how their mothers don't understand or accept them: Frankie's because of her disapproval of her self expression and Jo's mom not accepting her being gay or her gender expression ("Hand in My Pocket").

MJ tries to get drugs from the pharmacy, but she is out of refills. Desperate, she meets with a familiar dealer who provides her with opioids. MJ moves through her day backwards, starting with unpacking groceries at home, to getting her painkillers in the alley, keeping up appearances with other school mums, and ending with her running out of the pills at the beginning of the day ("Smiling"). On the last day of Frankie's English class before winter break, she reads a short story she wrote aloud in a writer's workshop for her class to critique. The students in the class criticize her since things she claims to be ironic in her piece are not actually ironic, just bad things that happened to someone. A new student, Phoenix, defends Frankie and encourages her to finish ("Ironic"). A romantic attraction begins between the two. After class, Phoenix and Frankie decide to go to a party that night. At home, MJ and Steve get into an argument. Steve says he wants to see a marriage counselor, yet MJ refuses ("So Unsexy"). Nick comforts MJ after the fight. MJ claims that Nick is the only thing that she has ever done right. Nick reflects on the pressures on him from his mother to be perfect ("Perfect").

Frankie and Nick go to the party ("Lancer's Party (So Pure)"). Frankie and Phoenix find each other and leave the crowded party to talk alone, and they discuss their imperfect family lives. Meanwhile, Jo doesn't attend the party because her mom forced her to go to a church function. Jo's mom scolds her for not dressing femininely enough ("That I Would Be Good"). The next morning, Jo shows Frankie pictures that are circulating throughout the school of Bella, Nick's friend, who was drunk, passed out, and had her shirt pulled up at the party. Students are making fun of Bella and calling her a slut. Frankie and Jo go to Bella's house, despite barely knowing her, to check on her. Bella reveals that Andrew, Nick's best friend, was the one who took the pictures and raped her. Frankie goes home and wakes Nick up to reprimand him about not going to the police because he was the only one who saw how drunk Bella was. Nick brushes off Bella's claim, saying that Bella was being dramatic per usual. MJ overhears the conversation and insists that Nick should not come forward as it might ruin his reputation. MJ blames Bella for what happened since she chose to drink, but she is visibly upset by the story ("Wake Up"). MJ walks to the church for the first time in a while to pray about her failing marriage, struggling relationship with Frankie, and for help with her addiction. She then reflects on her own memory of being raped in college, but blames herself and feels it was God's plan for her ("Forgiven").

Act II

Steve and MJ go to their first marriage counseling session, despite MJ's reluctance ("Not the Doctor"). Meanwhile, Frankie and Phoenix hang out at a playground and end up sleeping together ("Head over Feet"). Jo enters the Healys' house uninvited ("Your House") and walks in on Frankie and Phoenix. Jo gets mad and storms out of Frankie's room. MJ and Steve come home early and Jo tells them that Frankie and Phoenix had sex. Phoenix leaves quickly, leaving Frankie alone with her parents. MJ and Steve reprimand her for having sex so young. Frankie comes out to her parents as bisexual, and she gets mad at her parents for disapproving of her consensual sex but not caring about Bella's rape. Frankie runs away to New York City. Steve and MJ fight about Steve not being present during Frankie's childhood. Frankie takes a train alone to New York ("Unprodigal Daughter"). When she gets lost in the city, Frankie calls Phoenix. She tells him that she loves him and that he should come pick her up. When Phoenix doesn't say 'I love you' back and that he needs to stay at home to help his sister with a medical condition, Frankie gets angry and feels that Phoenix used her for her body.

Students are gossiping about Bella and her accusations against Andrew. Bella comes to the Healys' house to talk to Nick, but the only person home is MJ. MJ tries to comfort Bella by telling her she was also raped in college. Bella asks MJ when she started to feel better after her rape, but MJ doesn't answer. Bella leaves realizing that it may never get better. Nick comes clean to MJ, telling her that he walked in on Andrew raping an unconscious Bella, but he did nothing and left ("Predator"). Nick says he wants to go to the police, but MJ says that it would ruin his life and not help Bella's. Nick accuses her of only caring about herself and her reputation, and not about Bella. MJ hits him. Jo comes to New York to pick up Frankie after she calls her out of desperation, lost and out of money. Frankie shows little remorse for sleeping with Phoenix since she didn't think her relationship with Jo was exclusive. She tells Jo that she is in love with Phoenix. Jo ends the relationship ("You Oughta Know"). At home, MJ overdoses on pills. Steve and Nick find her unconscious ("Uninvited"). When Steve gets to the hospital, he is devastated that he didn't know MJ had an addiction and promises her he will be there for her and the family from now on ("Mary Jane"). When Nick gets to the hospital, MJ tells him that he should go to the police, but Nick already told the police about what happened to Bella. Meanwhile, many students attend the rally that Frankie organized to get justice for Bella. Bella is mad at Nick since people only believed her once Nick came forward, and her statement wasn't enough ("No").

A year has passed, and MJ is writing the Christmas letter again. She writes about the progress being made in their relationships and lives. MJ tells Frankie that she wanted her to feel like every other kid and not be treated differently because of her race, but Frankie tells her that she wouldn't have wanted to fit in with the people in their town ("Thank U"). Frankie dares MJ to email the Christmas letter to everyone, despite its frankness about her overdose and her dislike of the culture in their town. MJ sends it, deciding that this will be her last Christmas letter. Jo and Frankie rekindle their friendship, and Jo has a new girlfriend. Frankie and Phoenix are now just friends. Frankie and MJ, Bella and Nick, and Bella and MJ all now appear to have mended their relationships ("You Learn").

Productions

Cambridge (2018) 

In May 2017, it was announced that Jagged Little Pill will premiere at the American Repertory Theater in 2018. In March 2018, principal casting was announced, which included  Elizabeth Stanley starring as Mary Jane, Sean Allan Krill as Steve, and Derek Klena as Nick. Additionally, Lauren Patten was cast as Jo, Celia Rose Gooding as Frankie, and Kathryn Gallagher as Bella.

The world premiere production of Jagged Little Pill opened on May 5, 2018, and played through July 15, 2018. The production was directed by Diane Paulus. The musical was sold out throughout the show's 79-performance run, and became the highest-grossing and longest-running musical at the American Repertory Theatre.

Broadway (2019–2021) 

In January 2019, it was announced that Jagged Little Pill would premiere on Broadway in fall 2019. The principal cast from the world premiere production all transferred with the show to Broadway, with Paulus also continuing as director. The show began previews at the Broadhurst Theatre on November 3, ahead of an official opening night on December 5, 2019. However, the show suspended performances in March 2020 when all Broadway theatres closed due to the COVID-19 pandemic.

At the  2020 Tony Awards, Jagged Little Pill led with 15 nominations. The musical won two Tony Awards, with Diablo Cody winning for  Best Book of a Musical and Patten winning  Best Performance by a Featured Actress in a Musical.

Performances resumed at the Broadhurst Theatre on October 21, 2021. Heidi Blickenstaff temporarily joined the cast as Mary Jane, filling in for Stanley who was on maternity leave. Morgan Dudley and Adi Roy joined the cast, replacing Gooding and Cipriano, respectively. However, in December 2021, multiple performances Jagged Little Pill were cancelled due to COVID-19 issues within the show's cast and crew. Shortly thereafter, it was announced on December 20, 2021 that the production would close permanently. The producers cited the need to "prioritize the health and safety of the cast, crew, and entire team", retroactively making December 17, 2021 its final show after 36 previews and 171 performances.

Australia (2021–2022) 
An Australian production opened at Sydney's Theatre Royal in December 2021. It is scheduled to relocate to Melbourne's Comedy Theatre in January 2022. The cast features Natalie Bassingthwaighte (Mary Jane), Tim Draxl (Steve), Emily Nkomo (Frankie), Liam Head (Nick), Maggie McKenna (Jo), Grace Miell (Bella) and Aydan (Phoenix).

North American tour (2022-present) 
In February 2022, it was announced that Jagged Little Pill would launch a North American tour. In September 2022, the cast was announced. It starred Heidi Blickenstaff as Mary Jane, Chris Hoch as Steve, Lauren Chanel as Frankie, Dillon Klena as Nick, Jade McLeod as Jo, Allison Sheppard as Bella, and Rishi Golani as Phoenix.

Following technical rehearsals that began in August 2022 in Louisville, Kentucky, the North American tour opened on September 6, 2022 at the Smith Center in Las Vegas. The first year of the tour will travel to 30 cities across North America, with additional cities planned for subsequent years of the tour.

Planned West End production 
In February 2022, it was announced that Jagged Little Pill would premiere on the  West End, with a planned opening in November 2022. However, no official plans for the planned production have since been announced.

Cast and characters

Notable replacements

Broadway 
 MJ: Heidi Blickenstaff
 Frankie: Morgan Dudley
 Phoenix: Adi Roy

Music
Jagged Little Pill features songs previously written and recorded by Morissette, with the exception of "Smiling" and "Predator", which she wrote specifically for the show.

Musical numbers

Act I
 Overture – Company
 "Right Through You" – Company
 "All I Really Want" – Frankie, Mary Jane, Steve, Nick and Company
 "Hand in My Pocket" – Jo, Frankie and Company
 "Smiling" – Mary Jane and Company‡
 "Ironic" – Frankie and Phoenix
 "So Unsexy" – Steve, Mary Jane and Company
 "Perfect" – Nick
 "Lancer's Party (So Pure)" – Company
 "That I Would Be Good" – Phoenix, Frankie and Jo
 "Wake Up" – Frankie, Nick, Andrew, Bella, Steve, Mary Jane, Company
 "Forgiven" – Mary Jane, Steve, Nick, Andrew, Bella, Frankie, Jo, Phoenix, Company

Act II
 Entr'acte/"Hands Clean" – Company 
 "Not the Doctor" – Mary Jane and Steve
 "Head over Feet" – Steve, Mary Jane, Phoenix and Frankie
 "Your House" – Jo†
 "Unprodigal Daughter" – Frankie and Company
 "Predator" – Bella and Company‡
 "You Oughta Know" – Jo and Company
 "Uninvited" – Mary Jane and Company
 "Mary Jane" – Steve and Company
 "No" – Bella and Company
 "Thank U" – Company
 "You Learn" – Company

Keys

Cast recording
The original Broadway cast recording was released digitally on November 29, 2019, followed by a physical album release on December 6, 2019. The cast album is distributed through Atlantic Records, and is produced by  Tom Kitt and Neal Avron. It debuted at number two on the Billboard Cast Albums chart, number 14 on the Alternative Album Sales chart, and number 26 on the Rock Album Sales chart. 

At the  2021 Grammy Awards, the cast recording album won Best Musical Theater Album.

Controversy 
In the original world premiere production at the American Repertory Theater, the character of Jo was nonbinary, and portrayed by Lauren Patten, a cisgender woman. During the original production, Patten confirmed the use of they/them pronouns for the character and referred to them as non-binary and genderqueer on multiple occasions. Although the character's sexuality was never explicitly stated, there were multiple references to Jo being non-binary.

However, when the show transferred to Broadway, the show now openly referred to Jo as being a cisgender female. In a 2020 interview, Patten stated, "Jo never was written as anything other than cisgender". In April 2021, debate and backlash ensued on social media over the issue. The change in Jo's character was viewed as an example of the underrepresentation of trans and nonbinary people on Broadway. Despite this, following her Tony Award win for Best Featured Actress in a Musical, Patten thanked her "trans and nonbinary friends".

On September 18, 2021, lead producers Vivek Tiwary, Arvind Ethan David and Eva Price apologized for changing Jo's gender identity and for not listening to feedback. In their statement, the producers acknowledged their mistakes as they "set out to portray a character on a gender expansive journey without a known outcome". The show hired a new dramaturge to revise the scripts, and pledged to cast actors to play Jo who are on their own gender journey themselves.

Canadian actress Jade McLeod, who identifies as nonbinary, was cast as Jo in the North American tour of Jagged Little Pill. The character was re-established as nonbinary, with McLeod reporting being given some freedom in reimagining the role.

Critical reception

Cambridge production 
The New York Times called the Cambridge production "[p]assionate, dramatically compelling, and big-hearted...Jagged Little Pill breaks the jukebox musical mold, and takes on the good work we are always asking new musicals to do: the work of singing about real things." In a New York Times feature story published on May 20, 2018, the show's story, "steeped in hot-button issues like opiate addiction, gender identity and sexual assault", was described as being "very much of the present, and may just be the most woke musical since Hair."

Bob Verini of Variety wrote, "Not since Rent has a musical invested so many bravura roles with so much individual life...It's a risky business, making a musical not from a story demanding to be told but from a set of songs merely available to be used. Jagged Little Pill triumphantly avoids the pitfalls. Always engaging, often moving and even rousing, the show boasts dramatic interest and integrity on its own theatrical terms, courtesy of director Diane Paulus, first-time librettist Diablo Cody, and that peerless, soulful balladeer of the modern Western condition, Alanis Morissette."

Broadway 
The Broadway production of Jagged Little Pill opened to positive reviews. The New York Times described the musical as "redemptive, rousing and real... Jagged Little Pill stands alongside the original musicals that have been sustaining the best hopes of Broadway". Praising the show's score, Variety wrote, "Morissette’s youthful perspective and the rocking-good score make Jagged Little Pill feel very much of the moment". Rolling Stone awarded the production four out of five stars, writing that although the show feels "overly 'woke'" at times and "wears its earnestness on its sleeve", Jagged Little Pill burns with passion... and enthusiastic beauty." The show was nominated for 15 Tony Awards.

2022-2023 North American Tour 

Following a January 2023 viewing of the performance at Providence Performing Arts Center, reviewer John McDaid wrote in BroadwayWorld that a "[s]tellar national tour brings Morisette's music to life ..."  and called Jagged Little Pill "a powerful, moving production, superbly crafted and full of top-notch performances" and "...a rare show: a jukebox musical that feels organic; a "message" show that foregrounds authentic characters. Much of the credit goes to the excellent cast, who are intensely right there in the moment, at every moment. It's a powerful theatrical experience, a visual delight, and you absolutely will leave the theater singing."

Awards and nominations

Cambridge premiere production

Original Broadway production

References

External links
 

2018 musicals
Fiction about addiction
Alanis Morissette
American rock musicals
Fiction about social issues
Jukebox musicals
LGBT-related musicals
LGBT-related controversies in plays
Grammy Award for Best Musical Theater Album
Mental health in fiction
Plays set in Connecticut
Plays set in the 21st century
Rape in fiction
Tony Award-winning musicals
Works about depression
Drugs in popular culture
Works by Diablo Cody